Outlast is a 2013 first-person survival horror video game developed and published by Red Barrels. The game revolves around a freelance investigative journalist, Miles Upshur, who decides to investigate a remote psychiatric hospital named Mount Massive Asylum, located deep in the mountains of Lake County, Colorado. The downloadable content Outlast: Whistleblower centers on Waylon Park, the man who led Miles there in the first place.

Outlast was released for Microsoft Windows on September 4, 2013, PlayStation 4 on February 4, 2014, and for Xbox One on June 19, 2014.  Linux and OS X versions were later released on March 31, 2015. A Nintendo Switch version titled Outlast: Bundle of Terror was released in February 2018.

Outlast received generally positive reviews, with praise for its atmosphere, horror elements, and gameplay. , the game has sold 4 million copies. As of May 2018, the whole series has sold 15 million copies. A sequel, Outlast 2, was released on April 25, 2017, while a third installment, The Outlast Trials, is set to be released in 2023. The Murkoff Account, a comic book series set between Outlast and Outlast 2, was released from July 2016 to November 2017.

Gameplay 

In Outlast, the player assumes the role  of investigative journalist Miles Upshur, as he navigates a dilapidated psychiatric hospital in Leadville, Colorado that is overrun by homicidal patients. The game is played from a first-person perspective and features some stealth gameplay mechanics. The player can walk, run, crouch, jump, climb ladders and vault over objects. Unlike most games, however, the player does not have a visible health bar on the screen and is unable to attack enemies. The player must instead rely on stealth tactics such as hiding in lockers, sneaking past enemies, staying in the shadows and hiding behind or under things in order to survive. Alternatively, the player can attempt to outrun their pursuer. If the player dies, the game will reset to the most recent checkpoint.

Most of the hospital is unlit, and the only way for the player to see while in the dark is through the lens of a camcorder equipped with night vision. Using the night vision mode will slowly consume batteries, of which there are not many, forcing the player to scavenge for additional batteries found throughout the asylum. Outlast makes heavy use of traditional jump scares and audio cues, which alert the player if an enemy has seen them. If the player records specific events with their camcorder, Miles will write a note about it, providing further insight into his thoughts. Documents can be collected, which offer backstory and other expository  information about the facility,  including pages taken from the diaries of patients and reports from the hospital staff.

Developer Red Barrels have pointed to the survival-focused gameplay in Amnesia: The Dark Descent as a primary influence on the combat-free narrative style of Outlast. Found-footage horror films like Quarantine and REC also served as influences.

Plot
Freelance investigative journalist Miles Upshur receives an anonymous e-mail that inhumane experiments are being conducted at Mount Massive Asylum, a private psychiatric hospital owned by the notoriously unethical Murkoff Corporation. Upon entering, Miles is shocked to discover its halls ransacked and littered with the mutilated corpses of the staff. He's informed by a dying officer of Murkoff's private military unit that Mount Massive's deranged inmates, known as "variants", have escaped and are freely roaming the grounds, butchering Murkoff's employees. The officer implores Miles to escape and reveals that the main doors can be unlocked from security control.

Moving on, Miles is suddenly ambushed by a hulking variant named Chris Walker, who knocks him unconscious. While incapacitated, Miles encounters Father Martin Archimbaud, a self-appointed priest with schizotypal personality disorder, who claims Miles is his "apostle" and sabotages his escape by cutting off power to the front doors. Miles restores power, but Father Martin injects him with anesthetic. He shows Miles footage of "the Walrider", a ghostly entity killing patients and personnel alike, which he claims is responsible for the asylum's ransacking.

Regaining consciousness, Miles finds himself trapped in a decaying cell block filled with catatonic and demented patients. He escapes through the sewers to the main wards, pursued by Walker and two cannibalistic twins, only to be captured by Richard Trager, a former Murkoff executive driven insane. Trager amputates two of Miles' fingers with a pair of bone shears, preparing to do the same to his tongue and genitals. However, Miles escapes to an elevator, inadvertently crushing Trager to death between floors when he attacks him.

Miles reconvenes with Father Martin, who tells him to go to the asylum's chapel. Reaching an auditorium, Miles learns that the Walrider was created by Dr. Rudolf Gustav Wernicke, a German scientist brought to the U.S. during Operation Paperclip. Wernicke believed that intensive dream therapy conducted on traumatized patients could connect swarms of nanites into a single malevolent being.

In the chapel, Miles finds a crucified Father Martin, who gives Miles a key to the atrium elevator that he insists will take him to freedom before immolating himself. Miles takes the elevator, which descends into a subterranean laboratory. Walker attacks him, only to be eviscerated by the Walrider. Miles locates an aged Wernicke, who confirms that the Walrider is a biotechnological nanite entity controlled by Billy Hope, a comatose subject of Murkoff's experiments. He orders Miles to terminate Billy's life support in the hopes that this will destroy the Walrider. Miles accomplishes this task; however, just before Billy dies, the Walrider attacks Miles and possesses his body. On his way out of the laboratory, Miles encounters a Murkoff military team led by Wernicke, which guns him down. A horrified Wernicke realizes that Miles is the Walrider's new host. Panicked screams and gunfire are heard as the screen fades to black.

Whistleblower
Waylon Park is a software engineer working at M.M.A.  for Murkoff. His job entails maintaining the Morphogenic Engine, which controls lucid dreaming in comatose individuals. After several experiences working directly with the Engine and witnessing its effects on the facility's patients, he desperately sends an anonymous e-mail to reporter Miles Upshur to expose the corporation. Shortly afterwards, Park is summoned to the underground laboratory's operations center to debug a monitoring system. When he returns to his laptop, his supervisor, Jeremy Blaire, has him detained and subjected to the Morphogenic Engine after discovering his e-mail. However, Park escapes his restraints when the Walrider is unleashed. He roams the increasingly decrepit facility as surviving guards and medical personnel flee from the newly freed patients, searching for a shortwave radio that he can use to contact the authorities, all the while eluding a cannibal named Frank Manera, who wields an electric bone saw. Just as Park manages to find a working radio transmitter, Blaire appears and destroys it.

Park finds his way into the asylum's vocational block where he is captured by Eddie Gluskin, a serial killer obsessed with finding the "perfect bride" by killing other patients and mutilating their genitalia. Gluskin tries to hang Park in a gymnasium with his other victims, but during the struggle, he is entangled by his own pulley system and fatally impaled by a loose section of rebar.

At daybreak, Murkoff's paramilitary division arrives at the asylum, intent on eliminating the variants. Park slips past them and escapes into the main lobby. There, he finds a gravely wounded Blaire, who stabs him suddenly, insisting that no one can know the truth about Mount Massive, but the Walrider kills him before he can kill Park. Park then stumbles out the open front door and towards Miles Upshur's jeep, which is still idling near the main gates. He takes the jeep and drives away as Miles, now the Walrider's host, also emerges from the asylum.

In the epilogue, Park is sitting at a laptop with his camcorder footage ready for upload in order to expose the Murkoff Corporation. An associate informs him that it will be more than enough to ruin Murkoff, but is warned that they will then seek to eliminate him and his family. Despite some initial hesitation, Park decides to upload the file.

Development
Outlast was Red Barrels' first game, although the team had worked on big AAA games in Ubisoft prior like Prince of Persia, Assassin’s Creed, Splinter Cell and Uncharted. The game was made in 14 months with a team of 10 people. Red Barrels' CEO Philippe Morin said in 2018 that they initially could not find anyone to invest on the project for 18 months, which means 18 months without salary. Fortunately, they were able to get the funding from Canada Media Fund for $1.36 million CAD.

Release 
Outlast was released on September 4, 2013, for download through Steam, and it was released on February 4, 2014, for the PlayStation 4 as the free monthly title for PlayStation Plus users.

The downloadable content, Outlast: Whistleblower, serves as an overlapping prequel to the original game. The plot follows Waylon Park, the anonymous tipster to Miles Upshur and shows the events both before and after the main plotline. The Microsoft Windows version of Whistleblower was released on May 6, 2014, worldwide, the PlayStation 4 version was launched on May 6, 2014, in North America and on May 7, 2014, in Europe, and the Xbox One version launched on June 18 in North America and Europe.  Linux and OS X versions were later released on March 31, 2015.

In December 2017, Red Barrels announced that Outlast, including Whistleblower and the sequel Outlast 2, would be coming to the Nintendo Switch in early 2018. The title was released by surprise on February 27, 2018, under the title Outlast: Bundle of Terror via Nintendo eShop.

Reception 

, Outlast has sold over 4 million copies.

Outlast received positive reviews. Aggregating review website Metacritic gave the Xbox One version 80/100 based on 6 reviews, the Microsoft Windows version 80/100 based on 59 reviews, and the PlayStation 4 version 78/100 based on 33 reviews. It has been received with a number of accolades and awards from E3 2013, including the "Most Likely to Make you Faint" honor, and one of "Best of E3".

The PC gaming website Rock, Paper, Shotgun gave Outlast a very positive review, noting that "Outlast is not an experiment in how games can be scary, it’s an exemplification." Marty Sliva of IGN rated the game with a score of 7.8, praising the horror elements and gameplay while criticizing the environments and character modeling.

GameSpot gave the game a positive review as well stating that "Outlast isn't really a game of skill, and as it turns out, that makes sense. You're not a cop or a soldier or a genetically enhanced superhero. You're just a reporter. And as a reporter, you don't possess many skills with which you can fend off the hulking brutes, knife-wielding stalkers, and other homicidal maniacs who lurk in the halls of the dilapidated Mount Massive Asylum. You can't shoot them, or punch them, or rip pipes from the walls to clobber them with. You can only run and hide".

Sequels 

On October 23, 2014, in an interview with Bloody Disgusting, Red Barrels revealed that due to the success of Outlast, a sequel was in development.

It was initially intended to be released in late 2016, but was delayed to early 2017 due to complications during development. Subsequently, the release date was further pushed to Q2 2017, despite the intended Q1 2017 release.

On March 6, 2017, Red Barrels announced that a physical bundle called Outlast Trinity would be released for Xbox One and PlayStation 4 on April 25.

The sequel, titled Outlast 2, was made digitally available for Microsoft Windows, PlayStation 4, and Xbox One on April 25, 2017; and came to the Nintendo Switch, alongside Outlast, in February 2018. It takes place in the same universe as the first game, but features a new storyline with different characters, set in the Arizona desert.

Outlast 3 was announced in December 2017, though no time frame or target platforms were confirmed. During this announcement, Red Barrels said that because they could not easily add downloadable content for Outlast 2, they had a smaller separate project related to Outlast that would be released before Outlast 3. The project, teased in October 2019, is a prequel for Outlast 2, called The Outlast Trials, and is a horror game set in the Cold War. The game is in its early development stages, with a set 2023 release date.

References

External links 

 

2013 video games
2010s horror video games
Linux games
MacOS games
Video games about mental health
Amputees in fiction
Rape in fiction
Nanopunk
Nintendo Switch games
PlayStation 4 games
PlayStation Network games
Works about Project MKUltra
Psychological thriller video games
Psychological horror games
Splatterpunk
Survival video games
Works about whistleblowing
Red Barrels games
Single-player video games
Indie video games
Unreal Engine games
Video games adapted into comics
Video games developed in Canada
Video games set in 2013
Video games set in Colorado
Video games set in psychiatric hospitals
Video games set in the United States
Video games with downloadable content
Video games with expansion packs
Windows games
Xbox One games
Nanotechnology in fiction
Human experimentation in fiction